Messiah Prince Sheridan Damien Ritzinger (born 12 December 1990) is a German singer.

Biography 
Ritzinger was born in Johannesburg, South Africa to a German father and South African mother. During his childhood, he lived in Munich.

In 2015, he took part in the twelfth season of the British series The X Factor. In the 'Bootcamp', he was eliminated. In May 2016, Ritzinger won season 13 of Deutschland sucht den Superstar, the German version of the Idol franchise. In January 2020, he won German reality show Ich bin ein Star – Holt mich hier raus!. During this show, he came out as bisexual.

Singles 
 2013: "Easy Breezy und Deutsche Version"
 2014: "When I Think of You"
 2014: "Beep Me"
 2016: "Glücksmoment"
 2016: "Mich hält keiner auf"

References

External links 

 

21st-century German male singers
German pop singers
South African emigrants to Germany
Deutschland sucht den Superstar winners
Ich bin ein Star – Holt mich hier raus! participants
Ich bin ein Star – Holt mich hier raus! winners
German LGBT singers
Living people
Bisexual musicians
Singers from Johannesburg
Musicians from Munich
1990 births
20th-century LGBT people
21st-century LGBT people